Ron Huldai (born 26 August 1944) is the current Mayor of Tel Aviv, since 1998. Before he entered his role as Tel Aviv mayor, Huldai served as a fighter pilot and a commander in the Israeli Air Force. After leaving the army as a brigadier general, he entered the business world and was later headmaster of the Herzliya Hebrew Gymnasium in Tel Aviv. He announced in late December 2020 that he would run in the 2021 Israeli legislative election as part of a new left-wing party called The Israelis.

Early life 
He was born in 1944 in Hulda (his surname is taken from the name of the kibbutz), one of three brothers born to Polish Jewish immigrant parents who moved to Palestine from Łódź. His father Ozer Obarzański was among the founders of the kibbutz and the principal of its school, while his mother Hana was a teacher and headed the organization of performances at the kibbutz. Huldai grew up on the kibbutz. He studied at Tel Aviv University, Auburn University at Montgomery, the Air War College at Maxwell Air Force Base in Montgomery, Alabama, and the Advanced Management Program at the Wharton School of the University of Pennsylvania.

Military service 
Huldai was conscripted into the Israel Defense Forces in 1963, and joined the Israeli Air Force, serving as a combat pilot and becoming a career officer. During the Six-Day War, he participated in Operation Focus, and he shot down three enemy aircraft and participated in numerous missions. He subsequently participated in the War of Attrition and Yom Kippur War. Huldai held several key senior command positions, including as the commander of Nevatim Airbase, Hatzerim Airbase, the Air Force Pilots Training School, and a coordinator of the government authorities and supervisor of civilian construction projects for the IAF. He left the IAF in 1989 with the rank of Brigadier General.

Following his retirement from active duty in 1989, he entered the private sector. After spending two years selling air conditioners in Nigeria, he returned to Israel and managed the closure of a construction plant in Ramla. He then became headmaster of the prestigious Herzliya Hebrew High School for six years until 1998.

Political career 

A member of the Labor Party, Huldai was first elected mayor of Tel Aviv in early November 1998, was re-elected in 2003 with 62% of the vote, again in 2008 with 50.6%, in 2013 with 53% and yet again in 2018 with 46%. He planned to run for the Knesset in the 2021 Israeli legislative election as part of a new left-wing party named The Israelis. The party was joined by Justice Minister Avi Nissenkorn and MK Einav Kabla, both of whom had left the Blue and White party. However, Nissenkorn left the party on 31 January 2021, reportedly as a prerequisite by Israeli Labor Party leader Merav Michaeli for a merger between both parties, and on 4 February 2021 Huldai announced that the party would not contest the elections, having failed to reach an electoral agreement with other parties.

References

1944 births
Living people
Jewish mayors
People from Hulda, Israel
Israeli Labor Party politicians
Israeli Air Force generals
Israeli aviators
Israeli people of Polish-Jewish descent
Jewish Israeli politicians
Mayors of Tel Aviv-Yafo
Tel Aviv University alumni
Herzliya Hebrew Gymnasium alumni
Auburn University at Montgomery alumni
Heads of schools in Israel
Israeli Ashkenazi Jews